Arnaud Danjean (born 11 February 1971 in Louhans, Saône-et-Loire) is a French politician of the Republicans (LR) who has been serving as a Member of the European Parliament since the 2009 European election, representing France's East constituency. He was elected a member of the Burgundy Regional Council on 21 March 2010.

In parliament, Danjean chairs the European Parliament Subcommittee on Security and Defence (SEDE), which is a sub-committee of the European Parliament Committee on Foreign Affairs (AFET).

As member of LR, Danjean is also a member of the European People's Party.

Early life and education 
Danjean graduated in 1992 from Sciences Po with a Degree in "Communication, Research and Human Resource", and completed his curriculum in 1993 with a Postgraduate Diploma in Political Science and International Relations at Sciences Po.

Professional career

At the Ministry of Defence 
After completing his military service as a Reserve Officer at the submarine base of Toulon, Danjean passed an examination to join the French DGSE as a civil servant. He carried out numerous missions in Sarajevo in 1995 and 1996, especially during the Siege of Sarajevo and the signature of the Dayton Agreement. He became a permanent member of the French Embassy in Sarajevo from June 1996 to September 1998.

Danjean later worked as a Balkans' specialist for the Ministry of Defence and took part to the negotiations of the Rambouillet Agreement in February and March 1999.

After June 1999, Danjean carried out short-term missions in the Balkans and Central European Countries.

At the Ministry of Foreign Affairs 
Danjean joined the Mission of France to the United Nations in Geneva in 2002, and performed in 2004 a new mission in Kosovo for Javier Solana, High Representative for Common Foreign and Security Policy (CFSP).

In 2005, Danjean joined the staff of French Minister of Foreign Affairs Michel Barnier where he was in charge of the Balkans and Afghanistan. He remained in office from July 2005 to March 2007 unter the tenure of Philippe Douste-Blazy.

Political career

Early beginnings
Danjean stood for election at the 2007 French legislative election in Bresse (Saône-et-Loire) against the incumbent Arnaud Montebourg. He was defeated by less than 400 votes after leading the first round with 44% of the polls against 41.3% for Montebourg.

He spent an extended stay in the United States at the end of 2007 in the framework of a German Marshall Fund course.

Member of the European Parliament, 2009–present
Danjain first became a Member of the European Parliament on 7 June 2009 for the East constituency on the list headed by Joseph Daul. He was elected as chairman of the European Parliament Subcommittee on Security and Defence (SEDE), a sub-committee of the European Parliament Committee on Foreign Affairs (AFET). Following the 2019 European Parliament election, he also joined the Committee on International Trade (INTA).

In addition, Danjean serves as a member of the European Parliament's Sky and Space Intergroup (SSI). In 2010, he joined the Friends of the EEAS, an unofficial and independent pressure group formed because of concerns that the High Representative of the Union for Foreign Affairs and Security Policy Catherine Ashton was not paying sufficient attention to the Parliament and was sharing too little information on the formation of the European External Action Service. From 2014 until 2019, he was part of the delegation for relations with the NATO Parliamentary Assembly.

As part of his parliamentary work, Danjean carried out several missions, in particular in Georgia and Uganda. He was the rapporteur for the European Parliament's 2010 resolution on the Implementation of the European Security Strategy and the Common Security and Defence Policy.

Following the 2019 elections, Danjean was part of a cross-party working group in charge of drafting the European Parliament's four-year work program on foreign policy.

Within the centre-right European People's Party Group (EPP), Danjean has since been a member of the leadership team around chairman Manfred Weber.

Role in French national politics
Danjean was elected a Member of the Regional Council of Burgundy on 21 March 2010. A candidate at the 2012 French legislative election in Saône-et-Loire against Cécile Untermaier, who was supported by Arnaud Montebourg, he was defeated with only 49.6% of the votes.

Political positions
Danjean is widely considered an Atlanticist and proponent of NATO.

He welcomed François Hollande's decision to engage the French Armed Forces in response to the armed groups' offensive in Northern Mali on 11 January 2013, an action he called "inevitable, justified and legitimate" according to the circumstances and international law. He however regretted the inertia of the European Union despite a vote on a strategy for Sahel as soon as 2011, and criticised the inability of the French Government to involve other European countries which he sees as a consequence of the precipitate withdrawal of French troops from Afghanistan.

In 2015, Danjean warned fellow French conservatives against being soft on Russia, arguing that "through the fascination for Putin, there is a real philosophical and ideological pull-back, namely a rejection of political liberalism."

In the Republicans’ 2016 presidential primaries, Danjean endorsed Alain Juppé as the party’s candidate for the office of President of France. Ahead of the 2022 presidential elections, he publicly declared his support for Michel Barnier as the Republicans’ candidate.

Recognition
 2000 – Ordre national du Mérite

Other activities
 European Council on Foreign Relations (ECFR), Member of the Council

Publications 

He commented in 2007 the Declaration of European Muslims of Mustafa Cerić, Rais of Bosnia and Herzegovina.

He published in January 2013 an article in the Revue défense nationale : "Entre tentation du repli et fatalisme du déclin : l’Europe face à ses responsabilités" (Between the temptation of retreat and the fatalism of decline : Europe facing its responsibilities).

Decorations 

 Decorated Chevalier de l'Ordre national du Mérite in May 2000 (decoration awarded by the President of the Republic, Jacques Chirac, and pinned in December 2000 by the Minister of Defence Alain Richard).

References

External links 
 Arnaud Danjean's official website
 Official webpage on the website of the European Parliament
Google translation of his portrait in Le Monde, 30 May 2007

1971 births
Living people
People from Louhans
MEPs for East France 2009–2014
MEPs for France 2019–2024
Union for a Popular Movement MEPs
Knights of the Ordre national du Mérite
MEPs for East France 2014–2019
The Republicans (France) MEPs
Sciences Po alumni